Galatia was a region of Central Anatolia settled by the Gauls after their invasions in the mid-3rd century BC.  From then until 62 BC, the Galatians ruled themselves by means of decentralized Tetrarchies, but in 62, the Romans established a Kingdom of Galatia, which lasted around 35 years.

Kings of Galatia, 62–25 BC

References

Galatia